Rokita is a devil in Polish folklore, that is said to inhabit the gateways to the underworld, including the wetlands, forests, and the insides of old willow trees. In some local tales, he is seen as an equivalent of Leshy.

References 

Slavic folklore characters
Forest spirits
Water spirits
Shapeshifting
Mythological tricksters
Slavic demons